Floyd Alonzo McClure (14 August 1897, Shelby County, Ohio – 15 April 1970, Bethesda, Maryland) was an American botanist and plant collector. He was one of the world's leading experts on bamboo and worked in China for 24 years.

Biography
McClure was educated at Otterbein College from 1914 to 1916. He transferred to Ohio State University, where he graduated with A.B. in 1918 and B.S. in agriculture in 1919.
At Canton Christian College in Guangzhou, China, he was an instructor in horticulture from 1919 to 1923, an assistant professor of botany from 1923 to 1927, and curator of the herbarium from 1923 to 1927.

In 1921 Kang-Peng To was the plant co-collector with McClure on Hainan Island. In 1927 the management of Canton Christian College was transferred from American to Chinese people, and the English name of the institution was changed to "Lingnan University". At Lingnan University, McClure was an assistant professor from 1927 to 1928, an associate professor from 1928 to 1931, a full professor from 1931 to 1941, and the curator of economic botany from 1927 to 1941. He was recalled to the U.S.A. in 1941. During his time in China he went on three leaves of absence: on the first leave he married in 1922 his fiancée of seven years, on the second leave he received in 1928 his M.Sc. from Ohio State, on the third leave he received in 1936 his Ph.D. from Ohio State University. His doctoral dissertation was on the bamboo genus Schizostachyum. His bamboo research in China was supported by grants from the China Foundation for the Promotion of Education and Culture in 1929, from the Rockefeller Foundation in 1930 and 1934, and from the National Research Council in 1936.

He published articles in journals sponsored by Lingnan University, as well as in The Ohio Journal of Science, The Scientific Monthly, Kew Bulletin of Miscellaneous Information, Blumea, and Journal of the Arnold Arboretum.

McClure held Guggenheim Fellowships for the academic years 1942–1943 and 1943–1944. In 1943 the Office of Scientific Research and Development recruited McClure to do research on bamboo ski poles for alpine troops in the U.S. Army. McClure visited Central American locations to do research and conduct experiments on bamboo species suitable for making ski poles.

In his research on bamboo, he worked in seven province of China, Indo-China, the Philippines, Central America, and South America. He created a large collection of bamboo species at the Barbour Lathrop Plant Introduction Garden near Savannah, Georgia. McClure's 1966 book The Bamboos—A Fresh Perspective gave a thorough presentation of how the bamboos are cultivated, propagated, and used. The book, dealing with bamboos in Asia and in the tropical Americas, is important for its compilation of literature on bamboos from eastern and western sources.

McClure married Ruth Drury on 7 September 1922 in Dayton, Ohio. They met and became maritally engaged in 1915 when they were students at Otterbein College. In China they raised two young daughters, Sophie Louise (born in 1927 in Guangzhou) and Janet. Ruth became in 1959 his research assistant and worked with him daily until he died in 1970.

Eponyms
Maclurolyra tecta

Selected publications

References

20th-century American botanists
Ohio State University College of Food, Agricultural, and Environmental Sciences alumni
Academic staff of Lingnan University (Guangzhou)
Plant collectors
People from Shelby County, Ohio
1897 births
1970 deaths
American expatriates in China